Pavlodar is a city in northeastern Kazakhstan and the capital of Pavlodar Region. It is located 450 km northeast of the national capital Astana and 405 km southeast of the Russian city of Omsk along the Irtysh River. , the city had a population of 331,710. The population of Pavlodar is composed predominantly of ethnic Kazakhs and Russians, with significant Ukrainian, German and Tatar minorities. The city is served by Pavlodar Airport.

History
One of the oldest cities in northern Kazakhstan, Pavlodar was founded in the IX century as Imakia, the capital city of Kimak Khaganate.

Koryakovsky fort was founded in 1720 as an Imperial Russian outpost. The settlement was created to establish control over the region's salt lakes, an important source of valuable salt. In 1861 the settlement was renamed Pavlodar and incorporated as a town. Pavlodar's significance was due in large measure to the substantial agricultural and salt-producing industries that had developed there despite the town's relatively small population. Pavlodar's population numbered only about 8,000 in 1897. The name Pavlodar means The Gift of Paul, and was chosen to commemorate the birth of the Grand Duke Paul Alexandrovich of Russia.

After 1955, the Soviet Government's Virgin Lands Campaign provided the impetus for the rapid growth and development of modern Pavlodar. Under the program, large numbers of young men and women from throughout the Soviet Union were relocated to the city; industrial and commercial activity was increased; and from the mid-1960s on, Pavlodar grew to become a major industrial centre of both the Kazakh SSR and of the Soviet Union because of a major arms and armour manufacturing facility located in the city.

On April 1 2020, the city was subject to quarantine in an attempt to slow the spread of Covid-19.

Geography

Climate

Pavlodar has a warm-summer humid continental climate that borders on the hot summer one (Köppen Dfb but only ½ a degree below Dfa) with long, cold winters and hot summers. 

In July the temperature averages .

Demographics
The city's population is 331,119 (as of January 1, 2018), and the extended urbanized area has 342,321 inhabitants.

Ethnic groups are as follows (as of January 1, 2018):
 Kazakhs — 166,835 (46.54%)
 Russians — 152,032 (41.63%)
 Ukrainians — 15,184 (4.69%)
 Germans — 9,058 (2.73%)
 Tatars — 7,752 (2.34%)
 Belarusians — 2,852 (0.86%)
 Ingushetians — 1,279 (0.39%)
 Moldovans — 954 (0.29%)
 Azeris — 802 (0.24%)
 Chechens — 800 (0.24%)
 Koreans — 594 (0.18%)
 Polish — 574 (0.17%)
 Bulgarians — 475 (0.15%)
 Chuvash — 425 (0.14%)
 Bashkirs — 415 (0.13%)
 Others — 5,470 (1.65%)
 Total — 331,710 (100.00%)

Economy
The largest local industries are aluminum, industrial chemicals, and farm machinery. An oil refinery was completed in 1978. In 2012 Polish rolling stock manufacturer Pesa Bydgoszcz announced its intentions to build a tram assembly plant in Pavlodar in conjunction with the city's plans to buy up to 100 new trams from the manufacturer to shore up its aging public transport infrastructure. The pharmaceutical company Romat is based in Pavlodar.

Sports

FC Irtysh is a Kazakh football club based at the Central Stadium in Pavlodar. Another notable club formerly based in Pavlodar, FC Energetik, has since relocated to Ekibastuz.

The Chess Federation of Pavlodar organizes frequent citywide competitions such as «Pavlodar Open 2007» and «The Pavlodar Regional Cup», a fast chess competition. Several FIDE masters, and grandmasters including Rinat Zhumabayev, Pavel Kotsur, Yuri Nikitin Vladimir Grebenshikov, and Yelena Ankudinova, participate regularly in the events.

Ice hockey team Irtysh play in Nur-Sultan Ice Palace (capacity 2, 800). Pavlodar hockey players were the champions of Kazakhstan three times in the row in the seasons 2012/2013, 2013/2014 and 2014/2015.

Infrastructure

Public transportation

Tram 

Pavlodar has an 89 km streetcar (tram) network, which began service in 1965 with, as of 2012, 20 regular and 3 special routes. The network has a 60% share of the local public transport market. However, its fleet of 115 trams is due to be replaced by 100 new trams produced locally by Polish manufacturer PESA SA.

River Port 
Currently, Pavlodar River Port JSC is operating — a large transport and industrial enterprise engaged in cargo transit, extraction and sale of river sand, sells and transports crushed stone, coal, performs work on cleaning hydrological facilities.

Pavlodar River Port JSC is one of the active ports on the Irtysh River.

The project of the modern Pavlodar river port was developed in 1955 by the design institute "Giprorechtrans" on the instructions of the Ministry of the River Fleet of the USSR. Since 1965, the former wharf of Pavlodar, by the decree of the Council of Ministers of the Kazakh SSR, was renamed the Pavlodar River Port. Since that moment, a river port equipped with the latest transshipment equipment has been functioning in Pavlodar. By the mid-1980s, the Pavlodar River Port had become the largest transshipment hub. At that time, the Pavlodar River Port was in first place among forty river ports of the Soviet Union in terms of cargo transshipment volumes. During this period, on average, about 6.5 million tons of various cargoes were transported per year. Since 2001, Pavlodar River Port JSC has been a private enterprise.

Bus service 
There are 21 bus routes and 13 minibus (marshrutka) routes in the city.

Education
Several universities are located in Pavlodar, among them:
Pavlodar State University (named after S. Toraigyrov)
Pavlodar State Pedagogical University
Innovative University of Eurasia

Sister cities
 Bydgoszcz, Poland
 Omsk, Russia
 Denizli, Turkey
 Kropyvnytskyi, Ukraine

Notable people
Dmitriy Polikarpovich Bagaev - a photographer and local historian, lived in Pavlodar from 1889 until 1958.
Terenty Dmitrievich Deribas - a Bolshevik and member of the VChK, headed the Pavlodar revolutionary committee in 1920.
Pavel Zaharovich Ermakov - a Russian language teacher and editor of one of the first Soviet newspapers Unification, worked in Pavlodar from 1909 until 1918.
Kanysh Imantayuli Satbayev - a Soviet geologist, studied at the Russian-Kyrgyz school in Pavlodar from 1911 until 1914.
Maira Valievna Shamsutdinova - a native Kazakh singer and composer, was born in Pavlodar.
Anton Semyonovich Sorokin - a Russian writer and dramaturg, was born in Pavlodar.
Sergey Aleksandrovich Zaikov - a Kazakhstani gold medalist in the 4 × 400 metres relay, was born in Pavlodar.
Mariya Agapova - a Kazakhstani mixed martial artist
Vsevolod Ivanov - a Russian writer
Pavel Vasilyev - a Russian poet
Maxim Kuznetsov - a Russian ice hockey player, Stanley Cup winner with Detroit Red Wings

Gallery

References

External links
Government portal

Cities and towns in Kazakhstan
Populated places in Pavlodar Region
Semipalatinsk Oblast
Populated places established in 1720
1720 establishments in Russia
Populated places on the Irtysh River